The 1985 Army Cadets football team represented the United States Military Academy in the 1985 NCAA Division I-A football season as an independent. The team was led by head coach Jim Young, in his third year, and played their home games at Michie Stadium in West Point, New York. They finished the season with a record of nine wins and three losses (9–3 overall), and with a victory against Illinois in the Peach Bowl. The Cadets offense scored 396 points, while the defense allowed 232 points.

Schedule

Personnel

Season summary

Western Michigan
Clarence Jones 110 rush yards

Rutgers

at Penn

Yale

Most points Army scored since 1958
Craig Stopa's 53-yard field goal in the second quarter was a school record
Tory Crawford replaced injured Rob Healy (cracked ribs)

at Boston College
Tory Crawford (first start) 131 rush yards, three TDs [ECAC Offensive Player of the Week] 
Clarence Jones 103 rush yards

at Notre Dame

Colgate
Tory Crawford (off the bench) 136 rush yards

Holy Cross
Tory Crawford 134 rush yards, 2 TDs [ECAC Offensive Player of the Week]

at Air Force

Memphis State

vs Navy

With Vice President and former Navy pilot George Bush in attendance, Napoleon McCallum rushed for 217 yards, the second-most rushing yards by a Navy player against Army, and broke the NCAA single-season all-purpose yardage record of Pitt's Tony Dorsett.

Peach Bowl (vs Illinois)

References

Army
Army Black Knights football seasons
Peach Bowl champion seasons
Army Cadets football